This disambiguation page refers to earthquakes that have occurred in the Mexican state of Guerrero, including:

 1787 New Spain earthquake –  8.6 earthquake and tsunami affecting Guerrero.
 1911 Guerrero earthquake
 1957 Guerrero earthquake
 1964 Guerrero earthquake
 1979 Petatlán earthquake
 1982 Ometepec earthquake
 1995 Guerrero earthquake
 2011 Guerrero earthquake
 2012 Guerrero–Oaxaca earthquake
 2014 Guerrero earthquake
 2021 Guerrero earthquake